Ainer Martin Cleves (November 27, 1897 – March 23, 1990), sometimes known as Einar Cleve, was an American football player.  

Cleve as born in 1897 in Minneapolis. He played college football for St. Thomas College and later played professional football in the National Football League (NFL) as a back and end for the Minneapolis Marines for four seasons from 1921 to  1924. He appeared in 19 NFL games, 13 as a starter. He scored two touchdowns.

Cleve died in 1990 in Edina, Minnesota.

References

1897 births
1990 deaths
Players of American football from Minneapolis
Minneapolis Marines players